A Mars cycler (or Earth–Mars cycler) is a kind of spacecraft trajectory that encounters Earth and Mars regularly. The term Mars cycler may also refer to a spacecraft on a Mars cycler trajectory. The Aldrin cycler is an example of a Mars cycler.

Cyclers are potentially useful for transporting people or materials between those bodies using minimal propellant (relying on gravity-assist flybys for most trajectory changes) and can carry heavy radiation shielding to protect people in transit from cosmic rays and solar storms.

Earth–Mars cyclers
A cycler is a trajectory that encounters two or more bodies regularly. Once the orbit is established, no propulsion is required to shuttle between the two, although some minor corrections may be necessary due to small perturbations in the orbit. The use of cyclers was considered in 1969 by Walter M. Hollister, who examined the case of an Earth–Venus cycler.  Hollister did not have any particular mission in mind, but posited their use for both regular communication between two planets, and for multi-planet flyby missions.

A Martian year is 1.8808 Earth years, so Mars makes eight orbits of the Sun in about the same time as Earth makes 15. Cycler trajectories between Earth and Mars occur in whole-number multiples of the synodic period between the two planets, which is about 2.135 Earth years. In 1985, Buzz Aldrin presented an extension of his earlier Lunar cycler work which identified a Mars cycler corresponding to a single synodic period. The Aldrin cycler (as it is now known) makes a single eccentric loop around the Sun. It travels from Earth to Mars in 146 days (4.8 months), spends the next 16 months beyond the orbit of Mars, and takes another 146 days going from the orbit of Mars back to the first crossing of Earth's orbit.

The existence of the now-eponymous Aldrin Cycler was calculated and confirmed by scientists at Jet Propulsion Laboratory later that year, along with the VISIT-1 and VISIT-2 cyclers proposed by John Niehoff in 1985.  For each Earth–Mars cycler that is not a multiple of seven synodic periods, an outbound cycler intersects Mars on the way out from Earth while an inbound cycler intersects Mars on the way in to Earth. The only difference in these trajectories is the date in the synodic period in which the vehicle is launched from Earth. Earth–Mars cyclers with a multiple of seven synodic periods return to Earth at nearly the same point in its orbit and may encounter Earth and/or Mars multiple times during each cycle. VISIT-1 encounters Earth three times and Mars four times in 15 years. VISIT-2 encounters Earth five times and Mars two times in 15 years. Some possible Earth–Mars cyclers include the following:

A detailed survey of Earth–Mars cycler trajectories was conducted by Ryan Russell and Cesar Ocampo from the University of Texas at Austin, Texas. They identified 24 Earth-Mars cyclers with periods of two to four synodic periods, and 92 cyclers with periods of five or six synodic periods. They also found hundreds of non-ballistic cyclers, ones which would require some powered maneuvers.

Physics

Earth orbits the Sun in one Earth year, Mars in 1.881. Neither orbit is perfectly circular; Earth has an orbital eccentricity of 0.0168, and Mars of 0.0934. The two orbits are not quite coplanar either, as the orbit of Mars is inclined by 1.85 degrees to that of Earth. The effect of the gravity of Mars on the cycler orbits is almost negligible, but that of the far more massive Earth needs to be considered. If we ignore these factors, and approximate Mars's orbital period as 1.875 Earth years, then 15 Earth years is 8 Martian years. In the diagram opposite, a spacecraft in an Aldrin cycler orbit that starts from Earth at point E1 will encounter Mars at M1.

The shape of the cycler orbit can be obtained from the conic equation:

This gives:

Solving the quadratic equation gives:

with an orbital period of 2.02 years.

The angle at which the spacecraft flies past Earth, is given by:

We can calculate the gravity assist from Earth:

where  is the heliocentric flyby velocity. This can be calculated from:

where  is the velocity of Earth, which is 29.8 km/s. Substituting gives us V = 34.9 km/s, and V = 8.73 km/s.

The excess speed is given by:

The turn angle  can be calculated from:

Which gives , meaning that we have an  turn. The radius of closest approach to Earth  will be given by:

Where  is the gravitational constant of the Earth. A correction would therefore be required to comfortably avoid the planet.

Proposed use

Aldrin proposed a pair of Mars cycler vehicles providing regular transport between Earth and Mars. While astronauts can tolerate traveling to the Moon in relatively cramped spacecraft for a few days, a mission to Mars, lasting several months, would require much more habitable accommodations for the much longer journey: astronauts would need a facility with ample living space, life support, and heavy radiation shielding.

Aldrin proposed that the costs of Mars missions could be greatly reduced by use of large space stations in cyclic orbits called castles. Once established in their orbits, they would make regular trips between Earth and Mars without requiring any propellant. Other than consumables, cargo would therefore only have to be launched once. Two castles would be used, an outbound one on an Aldrin cycler with a fast transfer to Mars and long trip back, and an inbound one with fast trip to Earth and long return to Mars, which Aldrin called up and down escalators.

The astronauts would meet up with the cycler in Earth orbit and later Mars orbit in specialised craft called taxis. One cycler would travel an outbound route from Earth to Mars in about five months. Another Mars cycler in a complementary trajectory would travel from Mars to Earth, also in about five months. Taxi and cargo vehicles would attach to the cycler at one planet and detach upon reaching the other. The cycler concept would therefore provide for routine, safe, and economical transport between Earth and Mars.

A significant drawback of the cycler concept was that the Aldrin cycler flies by both planets at high speed. A taxi would need to accelerate to  around Earth, and  near Mars. To get around this, Aldrin proposed what he called a semi-cycler, in which the castle would slow down around Mars, orbiting it, and later resume the cycler orbit. This would require fuel to execute the braking and re-cycling maneuvers.

The castles could be inserted into cycler orbits with considerable savings in fuel by performing a series of low thrust maneuvers: The castle would be placed into an interim orbit upon launch, and then use an Earth-swing-by maneuver to boost it into the final cycler orbit. Assuming the use of conventional fuels, it is possible to estimate the fuel required to establish a cycler orbit. Other cyclers showed less impressive improvement, due to the shape of their orbits, and when they encounter the Earth.

See also
Interstellar cycler
Lunar cycler

Notes

References

Additional references
 
 

  }
 
 
 

Spaceflight concepts
Missions to Mars
Buzz Aldrin